Yanukovych Government may refer to:

 First Yanukovych Government, November 2002 to January 2005
 Second Yanukovych Government, August 2006 to December 2007